DeWitt Clinton Poole (1885–1952) was an American intelligence officer. He served as U.S. Consul General in Moscow, and acted as America's spymaster in Revolutionary Russia.

1918 Ambassadors plot to assassinate Lenin

Poole arrived in Moscow in September 1917, two months before the Bolshevik Revolution, and left via Petrograd in late 1918 for the port of Archangelsk. He was "active in implementing U.S. policy, negotiating with the Bolshevik authorities, and supervising American intelligence operations that gathered information about conditions throughout Russia, especially monitoring anti-Bolshevik elements and areas of German influence."

Historian Barnes Carr implicated Poole in the Ambassadors Plot to assassinate Vladimir Lenin in 1918, which the press termed the Lockhart—Reilly plot, after two of its principal agents. Poole employed Xenophon Kalamatiano as his main field officer. Besides Sidney Reilly, the main Russian plotter was Boris Savinkov, who ran an anti-tsarist and anti-communist underground. The group was eventually uncovered by the cheka, and the bolsheviks responded by escalating the red terror.

U.S. Secretary of state Robert Lansing allegedly initiated the plot after Lenin seized power in October 1917 and removed Russia from World War I, as part of a secret deal the Bolsheviks had struck with Germany. President Woodrow Wilson's foreign policy was publicly opposed to interference, but he told Lansing the Moscow coup had his "entire approval".

In addition to instigating an attempted coup d'etat, they laundered money through the British and French to send the American Expeditionary Force (AEF) on the Polar Bear Expedition under British Command by General Edmund Ironside in Operation Archangel, part of the North Russia intervention, an Allied intervention in the Russian Civil War. General Jean Lavergne, chief of the French military mission to Russia was aided by Consul General :fr:Joseph-Fernand Grenard, who attempted to recruit resistance armies to march on Bolshevik Moscow, and dispatched agents across Russia.

After the invasion failed, inquires were met with "evasive avoidance" in America. President Franklin Roosevelt in 1933 indirectly denied the matter in claiming a "happy tradition of friendship for more than a century".President Ronald Reagan again denied it in the 80's in a public address to the Russian people, stating "our governments have had serious differences, but our sons and daughters have never fought each other in a war."

See also

References

Bibliography and Further Reading
 
 
 
 
 
 

20th-century United States government officials
American diplomats
1885 births
1952 deaths
American expatriates in the Soviet Union